Novotel Century Hong Kong is a 4-star hotel in Hong Kong. It is located at 238 Jaffe Road, at the junction of Jaffe Road and Stewart Road in Wan Chai.

History
The hotel opened in 1991 and was formerly known as the Century Hong Kong Hotel.

On 1 November 2001, in conjunction with the 10th Anniversary of Century Hong Kong Hotel, the Hotel was co-branded to Novotel Century Hong Kong. The new co-branded name signifies the introduction of Accor's hotel brand Novotel in Hong Kong, following the partnership announcement early in 2001 between Century International Hotels and Accor.

Facilities
The hotel has 511 rooms, 3 restaurants, a bar, meeting and conference facilities, a gym and an outdoor swimming pool as well as a sauna.

Restaurants and bar
Le Cafe
Pepino Cucina Italiana
Delicious
AK's bar + lounge

References

Hotels in Hong Kong
Wan Chai
Hotel buildings completed in 1991
Hotels established in 1991
1991 establishments in Hong Kong
Century Hong Kong